Maicosuel Reginaldo de Matos (born 16 June 1986), known simply as Maicosuel, is a retired Brazilian professional footballer who plays as an attacking midfielder.

Career
Maicosuel was born in Cosmópolis, São Paulo. After very good performances playing for Paraná Clube, he was acquired by Cruzeiro in 2007. Despite great expectations, he never secured a position in the squad and was mostly used as a back-up until June 2008, when he was bought by Traffic Sports, an investor group, and left Cruzeiro to join Palmeiras.

After an unsuccessful spell at Palmeiras Maicosuel joined Botafogo in 2009. At Botafogo Maicosuel played at top level and with only five months at Botafogo he was elected the best player of the Rio de Janeiro State League. On 21 May 2009, TSG 1899 Hoffenheim signed "Mago" (Portuguese for 'Magician') from Botafogo for €4.5 million on a five-year contract. In the summer of 2010 he returned to Botafogo.

On 13 July 2012, Maicosuel signed a five-year deal with Italian club Udinese. He had a promising start as he scored on his Serie A debut against ACF Fiorentina, but soon afterwards his error from the penalty spot against Sporting Braga was decisive as Udinese lost the penalty shootout which would have granted the Italian team access to the group phase of the 2012–13 UEFA Champions League. Maicosuel was the only player to miss his penalty, attempting a Panenka chip that goalkeeper Beto easily caught. Braga would go on to win the shootout 5–4.

On 26 May 2014 Maicosuel returned to Brazil, joining Atlético Mineiro on a five-year deal for a fee of €3.3 million. The player had some good appearances in the second half of 2014, scoring in the Recopa Sudamericana against Lanús and in the Copa do Brasil semifinals against Flamengo, both competitions the club went on to win, but failed to secure a regular place in the team's starting eleven. In 2015, despite some good performances such as a brace against Internacional in early July, Maicosuel still could not make it as a first squad regular. He was eventually loaned to Emirati club Al Sharjah SCC in late July, on a year-long deal worth €1.8 million.

On January 29, 2018, after only seven months playing for São Paulo, Maicosuel is out of plans of club. Twelve days before, he played his last match for Tricolor, when the team lost by 2-0 for São Bento, in the opening round of 2018 São Paulo State League.

Career stats

Trivia
His name represents an unusual phonetic spelling of "Maxwell".

Honours
Paraná Clube
Campeonato Paranaense: 2006

Cruzeiro
Campeonato Mineiro: 2008

Atlético Mineiro
Recopa Sudamericana: 2014
Copa do Brasil: 2014
Campeonato Mineiro: 2015, 2017

Grêmio
Recopa Sudamericana: 2018

References

External links

1986 births
Living people
Brazilian footballers
Campeonato Brasileiro Série A players
Clube Atlético Sorocaba players
Cruzeiro Esporte Clube players
Guarani FC players
Paraná Clube players
Sociedade Esportiva Palmeiras players
Associação Atlética Internacional (Limeira) players
Botafogo de Futebol e Regatas players
TSG 1899 Hoffenheim players
Udinese Calcio players
Clube Atlético Mineiro players
Sharjah FC players
São Paulo FC players
Grêmio Foot-Ball Porto Alegrense players
Serie A players
Bundesliga players
Expatriate footballers in Germany
Expatriate footballers in Italy
Brazilian expatriate sportspeople in Italy
Brazilian expatriate footballers
Brazilian expatriate sportspeople in the United Arab Emirates
UAE Pro League players
Association football midfielders